Tarsem Jassar is a Indian singer, songwriter and actor associated with Punjabi films and music. He is well known for his work in films Rabb Da Radio and Rabb Da Radio 2. Jassar along with his label mate Kulbir jhinjer launched their own label 'Vehli Janta Records' in 2013.

Discography

Studio albums

Extended plays

Singles discography

As lead artist

As featured artist

Songwriting discography

Filmography

References

External links

{{Raag.Fm|tarsemjassar|Enigma EP}}

Indian male singers
Punjabi-language singers
Living people
Male actors in Punjabi cinema
Year of birth missing (living people)